The name E61 comes from the Faema E61 espresso machine, which was named for the solar eclipse in its year of introduction, 1961.

This technology was developed and patented by Faema in 1961 and revolutionized the espresso machine market, ultimately establishing them as a pioneering force within the industry.

E61 is a registered Trademark of Gruppo Cimbali S.p.A.

References

Espresso machines
Faema